This list contains the names of albums that contain a hidden track and also information on how to find them. Not all printings of an album contain the same track arrangements, so some copies of a particular album may not have the hidden track(s) listed below. Some of these tracks may be hidden in the pregap, and some hidden simply as a track following the listed tracks. The list is ordered by artist name using the surname where appropriate.

 The Naked Brothers Band, I Don't Want to Go to School: "Hidden Untitled Track" starts playing after the track "Everybody's Cried at Least Once."
 Nailbomb:
 Point Blank: Untitled hidden track starts after 10 minutes of silence of the final track "Sick Life".
 Napalm Death:
 Order of the Leech: After the track "The Great Capitulator" (after 7:07 minutes of silence) at 9:57 a soundbit comes fading in of a fan speaking of his attitude to metal music, mentioning bands like Krabathor or Immortal.
 Enemy of the Music Business: After the track "Fracture in the Equation" (after 6:08 minutes of silence) at 9:56 a secret soundbite comes fading in of a fan introducing himself.
Leaders Not Followers: After the track "Nazi Punks Fuck Off" (after 4:56 minutes of silence) at 6:11 a soundbite just like the two mentioned above comes fading in of a Welsh fan.
 Napoleon XIV, Second Coming: !Aaah-aH yawA eM ekaT oT gnimoC er'yehT (backwards version of "They're Coming to Take Me Away Ha-Haaa!) is an unlisted final track on the album. This is also available as a B-Side to They're Coming to Take Me Away Ha-Haaa on the 7-inch single.
 Nasum: Industrislaven: Final track "Söndermald" contains hidden track "Revolution II" at the end after about one minute of silence.
 Kate Nash:
 Made of Bricks : The song "Little Red" is the hidden track on "Merry Happy." Ironically, the album artwork features elements of this song despite it being a hidden track.
 My Best Friend Is You: The title song "My Best Friend Is You" is the hidden track at the end of "I Hate Seagulls."
 Negativland, Escape from Noise: Contains hidden track "Fire Song" at the end after about one minute of silence.
 Willie Nelson, Crazy: The Demo Sessions: An unlisted track (#16) is three additional demos: "Save Your Tears," "Half a Man," and "Within Your Crowd."
 Nena, Chokmah: "Ich hab's geahnt" begins about 3 minutes after "Carpe Diem (Soehne Mannheims Reggae Mix)".
 New Found Glory:
 Sticks and Stones: "The Toothpick Song" begins at about 24:00 of the final track, "The Story So Far".
 Catalyst: Two untitled hidden tracks follow the final track "Who Am I?"
 New Order:
 Brotherhood: In a 1987 interview with Option, Stephen Morris commented that the "mad ending" to "Every Little Counts" (which sounds like a vinyl record needle skipping the groove) is similar to the ending of The Beatles' "A Day in the Life." Morris also said: "What we should have done is make the tape version sound like the tape getting chewed up. The CD could have the sticking sound."
 Substance 1987: The track "Cries and Whispers" is incorrectly titled "Mesh" on all versions, therefor without credit of the song. Vice versa, the cassette version actually features "Mesh" as a bonus, but is incorrectly titled as "Cries and Whispers."
 Olivia Newton-John, (2): Acoustic version of "Physical" at 4:56 of "Act of Faith" (track 11) on the album.
 Nico, The Frozen Borderline - 1968–1970: 14 tracks are listed of the second CD of the set (based on Desertshore). After ten minutes of silence on track 14, a 15th song appears, which is an alternate version of "Frozen Warnings" (a song that originally appeared on The Marble Index).
 Nightwish, Oceanborn: The song "Sleeping Sun", which is unlisted on earlier releases of this album, can be heard after the last listed track.
 Harry Nilsson, Aerial Pandemonium Ballet: A spoken message by Nilsson at the end of track 19 was originally recorded for the 8-track tape cartridge version of the album, so that all four programs would be the same length.
 Nine Inch Nails:
 Head Like a Hole: Track 11 is a short untitled track, which is a vocal clip of Heather Day saying "Let's hear it for Nine Inch Nails! Woo! He's good".
 Broken: "Physical (You're So)," an Adam and the Ants cover, and a cover of "Suck" (a song Trent Reznor originally recorded with Pigface) at tracks 98 and 99. Original pressings of the album had these tracks on a separate 3" CD.
 The Fragile: On disc 2 or the "Right" CD, after "The Mark Has Been Made" plays the intro of "10 Miles High.", which is a vinyl exclusive on the album.
 Ghosts I–IV: 2 extra tracks titled 37 Ghosts and 38 Ghosts can be found by reconstructing the multitracks on the deluxe and ultra-deluxe special editions of the album.
 Nirvana:
 Nevermind: "Endless, Nameless" appears 10 minutes after "Something in the Way," but is not included on first pressings on the album and American (and international) pressings of the album after 1994.
 In Utero: "Gallons of Rubbing Alcohol Flow Through the Strip" starts about 20 minutes after the end of "All Apologies" on non-U.S. pressings. The song is listed on the back cover of the album, but is not a separate track. Also, in the booklet the lyrics are not listed on this song, Instead it says "Whatever."
 Candy/Molly's Lips: As part of this limited split single with The Fluid, Nirvana's song "Molly Lips" on the single has the word "Later" etched into the single's run-out groove (this could be a reference to The Beatles' infamous "Sgt. Pepper's Inner Groove" run-out groove track)
 No Alternative: Extra song "Verse Chorus Verse"("Sappy") at the end of the album, unlisted on the back cover of some pressings.
 From the Muddy Banks of the Wishkah: On the vinyl edition at the end of side 4 is the untitled track 18, which is the sound of concert outtakes and stage banter
 Live! Tonight! Sold Out!!: On the original VHS release, the live performance at track 16 of "Endless, Nameless" is not listed. On the DVD release, it is, but in turn, another unlisted track, this time a rehearsal of "On a Plain," plays after the credits.
 Merrill Nisker, Fancypants Hoodlum: "Solid Old" is the unlisted final track on the CD. 
 Nitocris, Nitocris: unlisted track 15 "Celtic" (instrumental).
 No Angels, Pure: After the 13th track "Venus" you can hear the studio outtakes. On the album Welcome to the Dance the hidden track is called "Say Goodbye."
 No Doubt, Return of Saturn: Following the final track "Dark Blue," "Too Late Instrumental" can be heard. On international versions of the album it's after the bonus track: "Big Distraction" in Europe and Australia, or "Full Circle" in Japan.
 No Use for a Name, Making Friends: "Beth" (a KISS cover) follows "Fields of Athenry," followed by a few minutes of accordion and the song "Gene and Paul I Hate You Most of All, Ace, You're the Ace, and Peter, You're the Cat (Kiss Song)"
 Nobuo Uematsu, Final Fantasy VII Reunion Tracks: Rewind the CD from the beginning of the first track to hear an instrumental (no choir) version of "One-Winged Angel" (Orchestra Version). Final Fantasy Songbook Maharoba: A few minutes after the last track, Revolving Light, another version of The Place I'll Return To Someday can be heard. Different from the track that opens up the album.
 NOFX:
 Wolves in Wolves' Clothing: There's a hidden track which does not appear on the track listing of the CD. This track is the number 19, and there Fat Mike can be heard singing some of the album songs and songs of the 7" of the Month Club collection. Some people say that Fat Mike recorded this drunk.
 So Long and Thanks for All the Shoes: After The final track, "Falling in Love," The track has a 'hidden ending' that starts at timecode 4:15. It is a recording of a segment from Howard Stern's radio show in which the host's DJ begins to play the track "Drugs are Good," from the band's HOFX EP. He clearly dislikes the track and stops it after 36 seconds, effectively labeling it as disco before going on to rename the band 'No Talent'. First Pressings of the CD included an extended jam after the Howard Stern clip. The song featured samples of Stern saying "No Talent" and "Just not Rocking" over and over. Later pressings did not have this jam song. Punk in Drublic's final track has a hidden track around 17 minutes in also.
 Nonpoint
 Recoil: At the end of track 13, "Reward," an acoustic version of "Past It All" begins to play.
 To the Pain: Track 31, after sixteen blank, 4 second long, untitled tracks, contains an untitled instrumental song which starts 9:22 into the track.
 Miracle: At the end of the last song "Lucky #13" a slow, piano-driven song called "Dead Soul" starts at 9:54 in the track.
 Norma Jean:
 Throwing Myself: Between the last and second to last song, there is an unlisted track that contains 6 minutes of silence. This album was from the time that Norma Jean was still called Luti-Kriss.
 O God, the Aftermath Deluxe Edition: Rewind the first song to -2:18 on a CD player and you get an instrumental going into the first song.
 Meridional: 15 minutes after the last track on the album, the hidden track "Oriental" can be heard.
 Larry Norman, Only Visiting This Planet: Some copies include a brief song snippet, "Oh, How I Love You," after the last song from the original album (but preceding bonus tracks on CD copies).
 Nox Arcana, Blood of the Dragon: After the last track "Eternal Champions" plays. Nox Arcana includes a hidden track (after the last song) on all of their albums, but the one on Blood of the Dragon provides an essential clue to solving the elaborate puzzle included with the album packaging.
 Paolo Nutini, These Streets: "Northern Skies" and an acoustic version of "Last Request" after final track "Alloway Grove"
 Justin Nozuka, Holly: The last track "If I Gave You My Life" is followed up by a gap, and then the hidden track "Don't Listen To A Word You've Heard" can be heard.

See also
 List of backmasked messages
 List of albums with tracks hidden in the pregap

References 

N